Hardbodies 2 is a 1986 adult comedy movie sequel to the 1984 film Hardbodies. It was directed by Mark Griffiths and featured Brad Zutaut, Fabiana Udenio, James Karen and Alba Francesca. The plot
involves two men, Scotty and Rags, and pair of film crews in Greece, assuming the identities of students taking part in Semester at Sea, and derives humor from the use of profanity and nudity. The movie was released by CineTel Films and it has a run time of 88 minutes. Leonard Maltin gave the film a "bomb" rating. The film features the Epirotiki Lines cruise ships Apollon XI and MTS Oceanos (the setting of Semester at Sea), which ran aground in 1989 due to Typhoon Dan and sank in 1991 due to uncontrolled flooding,  respectively.

In Australia, the unrelated Miracle Beach was sold under the title Miracle Beach: Hard Bodies II, even though Hardbodies 2 had been released in the country in 1987.

Cast
Brad Zutaut as Scotty Palmer
Fabiana Udenio as Cleo/Princess
James Karen as Logan
Alba Francesca as Zacharly 
Sorrells Pickard as Carlton Ashley
Roberta Collins as Lana Logan 
Brenda Bakke as Morgan
Sam Temeles as Rags 
Louise Baker as Cookie
Curt Wilmot as Sean Kingsley
Alexandros Mylonas as Brucie
Yula Gavala as Kidnapper's wife
Giorgos Tzifos as Cleo's father
Giorgos Kotanidis as Kidnapper

References

External links
 
 

American sequel films
American sex comedy films
American sexploitation films
1980s sex comedy films
CineTel Films films
Beach party films
1986 comedy films
1986 films
1980s English-language films
Films directed by Mark Griffiths (director)
1980s American films